The Battle of Da Lat started on January 31, 1968, as part of the Tet Offensive, a nation-wide campaign by the Viet Cong against the government of South Vietnam to coincide with the Lunar New Year. On the morning of January 31, communist forces attacked the city and took control of the city. After a protracted battle that was estimated to have left around 200 communists dead, the Army of the Republic of Vietnam and US forces regained control on February 9.

Planning 
Along with Phan Thiet, Da Lat was one of two regional centres in II Corps (South Vietnam) that were to be taken over. An official post-war communist history acknowledged that the attack and the Tet Offence as a whole was premature, noting "they had been given only enough time to prepare an ordinary campaign, and the conditions were not yet ripe ... They could not be sure of achieving these goals, especially the capture of Dalat." It further said that their “thinking, planning and organization was still at a simple level, while there were many things that could not be done in time." Finally, the timing of the attack was the subject of confusion because of a misunderstanding about the lunar calendar.

Battle 
The communists attacked in the morning of January 31, and cut off the roads and communications into the city. The US Military Police compound was levelled by mortar and rocket fire, wounding two military police. A reaction force was sent to evacuate the MP from their accommodation to a medical villa. The communists attacked the medical villa continuously with mortars. On 3 February 1968, the MP returned to the original compound under enemy fire to retrieve equipment, taking records, vehicles and radios, that had been left behind on January 31 without sustaining further casualties. The fighting then focused on Da Lat Air Base, where the ARVN were supported by the MP in attempt to dislodge the communists. The ARVN also faced sustained attacks on the Vietnamese National Military Academy (the foremost officer training school in the country) and the Pasteur Institute. The ARVN and South Vietnamese military police began to run out of ammunition, which had to be replenished with air. With further reinforcements called into Da Lat on 5 February 1968, the communists were put under increasing pressure until they were forced to withdraw on February 9. Around 200 VC were killed. Although South Vietnamese forces had to have substantially less casualties, this worsened through the battles because of periods of low supplies and support.

References 

History of Lâm Đồng Province
1968 in Vietnam
Da Lat